Heart of Champions (also known as Pressure Point in Australia and the United Kingdom, and Swing in Germany, also its working title) is a 2021 American drama film directed by Michael Mailer, from a screenplay by Vojin Gjaja. It stars Michael Shannon, Alexander Ludwig, Charles Melton, David James Elliott and Ash Santos.

The film was released on October 29, 2021 by Vertical Entertainment.

Cast
 Michael Shannon as Jack Murphy
 Alexander Ludwig as Alex Singleton
 Charles Melton as Chris Davenport
 David James Elliott as Mr. Singleton
 Ash Santos as Nisha
 Alex MacNicoll as John Kimball
 Michael Tacconi as Ted
 Lilly Krug as Sara
 Lance E. Nichols as Jack Harris

Production
In May 2019, it was announced Michael Shannon had joined the cast of the film, with Howard Deutch directing from a screenplay by Vojin Gjaja, Shannon will also serve as a producer on the film. In October 2019, Alexander Ludwig and Charles Melton joined the cast of the film, with Michael Mailer replacing Deutch as director. In November 2019, David James Elliott joined the cast of the film.

Principal photography began in Louisiana on November 2, 2019, and concluded on December 3, 2019. Louisiana State University served as a main set for the film.

Release

The film was released in select theatres on October 29, 2021 under a deal with Vertical Entertainment. It also became available on VOD services on November 19, 2021.

Critical reception

References

External links
 
 
 

2021 drama films
American drama films
Films set in 1999
2020s English-language films
2020s American films